Rayo de Jalisco Jr. (Spanish for "Lightning Bolt from Jalisco Jr."; born January 1, 1960) is the ring name of a Mexican Luchador Enmascarado (masked professional wrestler) whose real name has not been revealed, per Lucha Libre traditions. Rayo de Jalisco Jr. is the son of Rayo de Jalisco a famous wrestler from the early days of Lucha Libre; he also has a son who wrestles under the name Rayman. Rayo Jr. is a former two time CMLL World Heavyweight Champion and the reigning WWA World Heavyweight Champion, a title he has held since March 21, 2003. Rayo de Jalisco Jr.'s real name is not a matter of public record, as is often the case with masked wrestlers in Mexico where their private lives are kept a secret from the wrestling fans.

Early life
Rayo de Jalisco Jr. was born on January 1, 1960, in Guadalajara, Jalisco, Mexico, son of legendary wrestler Rayo de Jalisco Sr. and the nephew of wrestlers Tony Sugar and Black Sugar. He was not initially trained by his father as his father did not want his son to follow into his profession; instead he trained under Diablo Velazco.

Professional wrestling career
The future Rayo de Jalisco Jr. turned professional at the age of 15 and initially wrestled under the name "Rayman" to keep his father from finding out he was wrestling. After working as a wrestler for a year he finally revealed to his father that he was wrestling and that he was serious. After seeing his son wrestle, Rayo de Jalisco Sr. decided to allow his son to work as "Rayo de Jalisco Jr." and wear the lightingbolt mask that was synonymous with the Rayo de Jalisco character. Rayo de Jalisco Jr. worked most of the 1970s alongside his father, receiving further training along the way. By the early 1980s he was working for Empresa Mexicana de Lucha Libre (EMLL), Mexico's largest professional wrestling promotion. In 1982 Rayo de Jalisco Jr. began a wrestling storyline, called a feud, with MS-1 that ended when Rayo de Jalisco Jr. defeated MS-1 in a Luchas de apuestas, mask vs. mask match to unmask the hated villain (called a Rudo in Lucha Libre). Throughout the early 1980s Rayo de Jalisco Jr. teamed up with equally popular Cien Caras to form a very successful team, working main events all over Mexico. On January 8, 1984, Rayo de Jalisco Jr. captured his first singles championship as he defeated Pirata Morgan to win the Mexican National Heavyweight Championship. His first championship success also led to his greatest rivalry as Cien Caras turned on Rayo de Jalisco Jr. in his quest to win the Mexican National Heavyweight Title. Cien Caras defeated his former teammate for the title on March 30, 1984. On June 21, 1985, Rayo de Jalisco Jr. defeated MS-1 to capture the NWA World Light Heavyweight Championship in the main event of an Arena Mexico show. In November 1985 Rayo de Jalisco Jr. teamed with Ringo Mendoza and the Kiss to win the Mexican National Trios Championship from Los Brazos (El Brazo, Brazo de Oro, and Brazo de Plata). The trio held the title for 275 days before losing it to Pirata Morgan, Jerry Estrada, and Hombre Bala. On March 20, 1987, Rayo de Jalisco's 637-day reign as NWA World Light Heavyweight Champion ended as he lost to MS-1. By 1990 the storyline between Rayo de Jalisco Jr. and Cien Caras became so heated that they were the main event of EMLL's 57th Anniversary show in a Luchas de Apuestas, mask vs. mask match. Rayo de Jalisco Jr. defeated Cien Caras two falls to one and forced Cien Caras to unmask.

Over the next couple of years Rayo de Jalisco Jr. won the Mexican National Heavyweight Title on a further two occasions, defeating Gran Markus Jr. and El Egipico to win the title. His third and final reign ended on February 21, 1994, when he lost to Pierroth Jr. On November 3, 1995, Rayo de Jalisco Jr. and Atlantis teamed up to win the CMLL World Tag Team Championship from The Headhunters. The duo successfully defended it against Máscara Año 2000 and Universo 2000, and against Apolo Dantés and El Canek. On August 6, 1996, Gran Markus Jr. and El Hijo del Gladiador won the title from Rayo de Jalisco Jr. and Atlantis. On April 14, 1996, Rayo de Jalisco Jr. won the CMLL World Heavyweight Championship from Apolo Dantés, the highest singles championship in the company. He made three successful defenses against the former champion Apolo Dantés, as well as thwarting the challenges of Gran Markus Jr. and Máscara Año 2000. On April 18, 1997, Rayo de Jalisco Jr. lost the title to Steel after a slow building storyline between the two. In 1997 Steel left CMLL to work for the World Wrestling Federation (WWF) as "Val Venis", ending the storyline with Rayo de Jalisco Jr. without a satisfactory conclusion. CMLL convinced the WWF to let Steel return to CMLL for a brief visit, just long enough to lose a Luchas de Apuestas to Rayo de Jalisco Jr. giving Rayo another mask win. A few months after unmasking Steel, Rayo de Jalisco Jr. became a two-time CMLL World Heavyweight Champion when he defeated Universo 2000 for the belt. He successfully defended the championship against Cien Caras and Mascara Año 2000, before losing it back to Universo 2000. Rayo de Jalisco Jr. was injured in the match against Universo 2000, as a mistimed Tombstone piledriver injured his neck, forcing him out of the ring for over six months and almost causing him to retire.

In 2001 Rayo de Jalisco Jr. dropped the "Junior" part of his name as his son, who had wrestled for two years, took the "Rayo de Jalisco" name, sometimes billed as el Hijo de Rayo de Jalisco Jr. (the son of Rayo de Jalisco Jr.) and other times simply Rayo de Jalisco Jr.. The confusing name changes only lasted for a couple of months before Rayo Jr's son changed his name to Hombre sin Nombre (the man without name) as part of a storyline where the son was trying to get out from Rayo de Jalisco Jr.'s shadow. His son would later begin working as "Rayman", the same name that Rayo de Jalisco Jr. originally used. Since 2003 Rayo de Jalisco Jr. has not worked for CMLL on a regular basis, instead he works for a number of Independent circuit Mexican promotions. On March 21, 2003, Rayo de Jalisco Jr. won the WWA World Heavyweight Championship, defeating Rey Misterio Sr. in the finals of a tournament to crown a new champion. Rayo de Jalisco Jr. still holds that title to this day,  later. In 2004 Rayo de Jalisco Jr. made a brief return to CMLL teaming up with Black Warrior and El Canek to win the CMLL World Trios Championship from Dr. Wagner Jr., Universo 2000, and Black Tiger (III). The team quickly lost the title to Héctor Garza, Tarzan Boy, and El Terrible. In 2005 Rayo de Jalisco Jr. suffered another serious injury when he injured both his knees in a match against Máscara Año 2000; his legs got caught on the ropes as he jumped out of the ring and he tore ligaments in both knees. The injury kept him out of the ring for almost half a year but  he made a full recovery and returned to the ring. Rayo de Jalisco Jr. made his return to CMLL in May 2010, siding with the CMLL loyalists in their feud with Los Invasores, especially Invasore members Universo 2000 and Máscara Año 2000, reigniting the long-running storyline between them. Rayo de Jalisco Jr. only worked a few matches for CMLL in mid-2010 but returned to the promotion in early 2013. He was on hand for a press conference, announcing that CMLL's annual Homenaje a Dos Leyendas show would pay tribute to his father, Rayo de Jalisco Sr. During the press conference he was confronted by longtime rival Universo 2000 who challenged him to a match for the Dos Leyendas show. At the show, Rayo de Jalisco Jr., Shocker, and Rush defeated Universo 2000, Mr. Niebla, and El Terrible by disqualification. Two days later, on March 17, 2013, Rayo de Jalisco Jr. competed in a four-way, steel cage match billed by IWRG as Prison Fatal ("Deadly Prison") against Cien Caras Jr., Máscara Año 2000 Jr., and Pirata Morgan. During the match Hijo de Máscara Año 2000 interfered, which caused Pirata Morgan Jr. to enter the match as well to escalate the rivalry between Los Piratas and Los Capos Junior. The match ended with Pirata Morgan being the last man in the cage and thus had his hair shaved off.

Championships and accomplishments
Consejo Mundial de Lucha Libre
CMLL World Heavyweight Championship (2 times)
CMLL World Tag Team Championship (1 time) – with Atlantis
CMLL World Trios Championship (1 time) – with El Canek and Black Warrior
Mexican National Heavyweight Championship (3 times)
Mexican National Tag Team Championship (1 time) – with Tony Benetto
Mexican National Trios Championship (1 time) – with Ringo Mendoza and El Kiss
NWA World Light Heavyweight Championship (1 time)
Copa de Arena Mexico: 2002 – Black Warrior and Lizmark Jr.
International Gran Prix (1994, 1998)
Federación Internacional de Lucha Libre
FILL Heavyweight Championship (1 time)
Nueva Generación Lucha Libre
NGLLHeavyweight Championship (1 time, current)
World Wrestling Association
WWA World Heavyweight Championship (1 time, current)
WWA Tag Team Championship (1 time) - with Rayman

Luchas de Apuestas record

Footnotes

References

External links
Cagematch.net profile

1960 births
20th-century professional wrestlers
21st-century professional wrestlers
Living people
Masked wrestlers
Mexican male professional wrestlers
Professional wrestlers from Jalisco
People from Guadalajara, Jalisco
Unidentified wrestlers
Mexican National Tag Team Champions
Mexican National Trios Champions
CMLL World Heavyweight Champions
CMLL World Tag Team Champions
NWA World Light Heavyweight Champions